Pine Grove Township or Pinegrove Township may refer to the following places in the United States:

 Pine Grove Township, Michigan
 Pine Grove Township, Schuylkill County, Pennsylvania
 Pine Grove Township, Warren County, Pennsylvania
 Pinegrove Township, Venango County, Pennsylvania

See also

Pine Grove (disambiguation)

	

Township name disambiguation pages